The Reserve Component of the Indonesian National Armed Forces (abbreviated into Komcad TNI) is the military reserve force of Indonesia, jointly managed under the General Headquarters of the Indonesian National Armed Forces ( or TNI) and the Indonesian Ministry of Defense.

Overview 
The reserve is formed as the result of the implementation of the 2019 National Resource Management for State Defense Act through Government Regulation No. 3/2021 and Defense Ministerial Regulation No. 3/2021. The word 'component' refers to the three aspects of Indonesian state defense resource management, as follow:

 Principal component refers to the Indonesian National Armed Forces and military resources;
 Reserve component refers to the voluntary, part-time armed reserve force and other potential reserve resource and facilities, ready to be mobilized at any moment;
 Support component refers to the Indonesian National Police, police resources, and others trained citizens (such as retired military and police personnel, as well as other civilian security forces) and resources.

The reserve force is meant to augment and directly support the principal component through mobilization in order to defend the state from military and hybrid threats both at home and abroad.

Personnel 

The reserve component are grouped into the three branch of the military: land, sea, and air reserves, and can be mobilized by the President in time of war or national emergency, with the permission of the People's Representative Council.

Recruitment 

The reservists are recruited from all male citizens who is not a current member of the armed forces or the national police, and it is a voluntary service. University students, members of the Indonesian Civil Service, and other working member of society are also allowed to apply and join the reserve, without the need to leave their study and work.

Recruits must be at least 18 or at most 35 years old on the first day of the basic military training, have a healthy body and be of sound mind, no criminal records as proven by police statement, and must be at least a junior high school graduate ( or SMP, equivalent to middle school).

All recruitment process is conducted by local reserve recruitment committee, which themselves are overseen by a central committee. The recruitment process will select recruits based on their health (physical and mental) and physical fitness, as well based on personnel and administrative research. The recruits are also selected based on their competence regarding general knowledge, psychological tests, and interviews.

Training 
Following the recruitment process, the reserve recruits will have to complete a three-month basic military training at their local military training regiments (such as by army Rindams, though not necessarily army, as naval and air force training facilities and personnel may be used), or directly trained by active available army, naval, or air force units in the areas were they live.

To carry out this education, the TNI Reserve Component Troops can attend education in the Training Unit in accordance with the dimensions taken and in education the TNI Reserve Component Troops (Komcad) are divided into 4 (four) Education Units. The position of each educational unit is as follows:

 Land Force Komcad Training Unit at the nearest Rindam/Kodam.
 Air Force Komcad Training Unit at Education Wing 800/Kopasgat, Sulaiman Air Force Base, Bandung.
 Marine Force Komcad Training Unit at Kodikmar, Surabaya (for all Indonesian Navy reservists).
 Komcad Indonesian Defense University Student Cadet's Training Unit at the Military Academy, Magelang.

Recruits will receive allowance, field uniforms, healthcare, workplace insurance, and life insurance for the duration of their training.

Recruits who managed to complete their training, will then be sworn in as reservists. They will receive military ranks, though only applicable during their active duty, and will also receive reservist ID numbers. The reserve ranks will be based on their education level:

 Recruits with a vocational diploma (D-III and D-IV), received a bachelor's degree (S1), or achieved a professional certification (such as board-certified doctors, nurses, and surveyors) will receive an officer's commission in the Armed Forces as a Second Lieutenant in the Reserve;
 Recruits with a senior high school diploma (SMA) or its equivalent will receive an NCO rank of Sergeant; and
 Recruits with a junior high school diploma (SMP) or its equivalent will be welcomed into the ranks of the enlisted and hold the rank of Private/Airman/Seaman Recruit.

Active and inactive durations 

Reservists may receive base allowance, operational allowance (only when the reserve is mobilized), healthcare, workplace and life insurance, and awards. These awards include any veterans' awards if they are mobilized, and reservists' brevet to mark their service.

The reserves are summoned to active duty only when (1) a general mobilization has been announced by the President in time of national emergency or war, and (2) a call for refresher training. A refresher training may last between 12 to 90 days, and may be conducted by a local military training regiments in base, in combat training sites, or by other battalion-sized units.

During active duty, reservists are to be considered service personnel who are part of the armed forces, and thus subject to military law and regulations established by law.

Reservists' active duty will end until they are (1) demobilized, or (2) completed their refresher training.

During the reserve's inactive duration, their field equipment and uniform are to be kept at their unit base, are not allowed to keep their firearms, and are expected to be called to active duty at any moment.

Discharge 
Reservists of the Reserve Component can be honorably discharged if:

 reached the age of 48;
 suffered from ill health which may prevent a reservist to be called to active duty;
 died in combat, during active duties, or during inactive times; 
 missing in action during active duties, 6 months after declared missing;
 resign due to personal reasons; and
 involuntarily lost their Indonesian citizenship.

On the other hand, reservists can also receive a dishonorable discharge if:

 follow and spread ideologies incompatible with Pancasila;
 become a member of a banned organization;
 threaten and endanger the safety and security of the state;
 conducting undesirable and undisciplined behaviors, which may include:
 suicide or suicide attempts;
 desertion from active duties or did not answer the call to active duties;
 other unethical, improper, or disrespectful acts.
 convicted of a crime, which resulted in prison time sentence of at least 1 year;
 voluntarily lost their Indonesian citizenship.

References

Military of Indonesia
Reserve forces